The 1931 German Ice Hockey Championship was the 15th season of the German Ice Hockey Championship, the national championship of Germany. Berliner Schlittschuhclub won the championship by defeating VfB Konigsberg in the final.

First round

Group A

Group B

Final

References

External links
German ice hockey standings 1912-1932

Ger
German Ice Hockey Championship seasons
Ice hockey